Tammy Hynes (11 August 1897 – 9 September 1969) was an Australian rules footballer who played with South Melbourne in the Victorian Football League (VFL).

Hynes was a member of South Melbourne's 1918 premiership team, in his debut season. A centreman, Hynes retired in 1924 after 57 league games. His grandson Tom played for South Melbourne during the 1960s.

References
Holmesby, Russell and Main, Jim (2007). The Encyclopedia of AFL Footballers. 7th ed. Melbourne: Bas Publishing.

External links

1897 births
Australian rules footballers from Victoria (Australia)
Sydney Swans players
Sydney Swans Premiership players
1969 deaths
One-time VFL/AFL Premiership players